The NWA Pacific Northwest Tag Team Championship was a professional wrestling championship sanctioned by the National Wrestling Alliance and defended in its member promotion Pacific Northwest Wrestling, which promoted shows in the U.S. states of Oregon and Washington.

The original version of the title lasted from 1952 until the company's closure in 1992, when Don Owen retired and sold his company to Sandy Barr. Barr retired all NWA PNW titles with Owen and began operating under the company name "Championship Wrestling USA", creating new championships. In 1993, the belts were used to represent the AAA/IWC World Tag Team Championship until it was deactivated in 1994. The actual retired (Owen Era) NWA Pacific Northwest Tag Team Championship belts were kept by Sandy Barr, refurbished due to age and were being used by the International Grappler's Alliance, his wrestling organization. With Sandy Barr's passing, Josh Barr started PDX Pro Wrestling in St. Johns, Oregon, in 2007, which is using the original PNW Tag Team belts. They were reactivated in 2015 in St John's NWA Blue Collar Wrestling and would be deactivated again in 2018

Title history

Footnotes

References

National Wrestling Alliance championships
Pacific Northwest Wrestling championships
Regional professional wrestling championships
Tag team wrestling championships